Intelcystiscus teresacarrenoae is a species of very small sea snail, a marine gastropod mollusk or micromollusk in the family Cystiscidae.

Distribution
This marine species occurs off Guadeloupe. It is named after Teresa Carreño, who was paid tribute in the first edition of the Musiciennes in Guadeloupe festival, which took place at the same time as the expedition that collected the holotype.

References

Teresacarrenoae
Gastropods described in 2016
Cystiscidae